Phil and Dan Brookes, otherwise known as the Brookes Brothers, are two London-based drum and bass producers.

History
In 2006 they surfaced with "Portal" / "Desert Island" on Danny Wheeler's W10 imprint. This was followed by "Verano", a collaborative effort with Nick Douwma, otherwise known as Sub Focus. In 2007, the Brookes Brothers were exclusively signed to DJ Fresh and Adam F's label Breakbeat Kaos. Their first release was "Hard Knocks" / "Mistakes", receiving major radio support from Zane Lowe, Pete Tong and the Trophy Twins, as well as staple drum & bass DJ's such as Andy C, Grooverider, and Adam F. The double A-side entered the UK Indie Chart at number 25. In 2007, collaborated with another rising drum and bass star, Culture Shock, creating the monster track "Rework". In 2008, the brothers continue to assault the market with a host of big tunes such as F-Zero, Gold Rush, Dawn Treader and Crackdown. They hold residencies in both Fabric and Herbal nightclubs, playing regular national and international DJ sets. Their self-titled debut album was finally released in 2011, under the label Breakbeat Kaos.

Discography

Albums

Singles

Other songs and appearances

Remixes

References

External links
 
 Viper Recordings artist page
 Beatport artist page

British drum and bass music groups
English electronic music duos
Male musical duos
Sibling musical duos
Drum and bass duos
Musical groups established in 2002
2002 establishments in England